Alicia Helda Puleo García (born 30 November 1952) is an Argentine-born feminist philosopher based in Spain. She is known for the development of ecofeminist thinking. Among her main publications is Ecofeminismo para otro mundo posible (Ecofeminism for Another Possible World; 2011).

Biography
Alicia Puleo holds a PhD in Philosophy from the Complutense University of Madrid and is a Profesora Titular (associate professor) of Moral and Political Philosophy at the University of Valladolid.

She is a member of the latter university's Council of the Chair of Gender Studies, and of the Council of the Complutense University's  (in English: Feminist Research Institute).

She directed the Chair of Gender Studies at the University of Valladolid for a decade (2000–2010) and has coordinated several seminars at the Instituto de Investigaciones Feministas, including the Discurso sobre la sexualidad y crítica feminista (Discourse on Feminist Sexuality and Criticism) and Feminismo y ecología (Feminism and Ecology).

Puleo has combined her teaching career with research and the publication of numerous books and articles on inequality between men and women, gender, and feminism.

Género y sexo en la Filosofía Contemporánea (Dialectic of Sexuality: Gender and Sex in Contemporary Philosophy; 1992).

In 2004, she coordinated editing of the book Mujeres y Ecología: Historia, Pensamiento, Sociedad (Women and Ecology: History, Thought, Society), which included the relationship between the environmental movement and the feminist movement and different experiences in Spain and the international arena.

In 2011 Puleo published Ecofeminismo para otro mundo posible (Ecofeminism for Another Possible World), a work in which in addition to collecting the history of ecofeminism and analyzing the contributions of the feminist movement to the environmental, not always recognized, she develops her proposal of what she has called a critical or enlightened ecofeminism.

In September 2014 she assumed the direction of the publisher Editorial Cátedra's Feminism Collection.

In 2015, she published the collective book Ecología y género en diálogo interdiciplinar (Gender and Ecology in Interdisciplinary Dialogue), in which the socio-cultural frameworks that weave relationships between bodies and the ecosystems they inhabit are analyzed.

Gender inequality
Puleo's work is articulated around the concern for inequality between men and women. She analyzes the socio-cultural mechanisms that prevent overcoming this inequality and the means that feminist philosophy offers to defuse them. In some of her studies on the French Enlightenment she examines the roots of this pending subject of modern democracies. The works dedicated to the evolution of the concept of sexuality in Arthur Schopenhauer's contemporary philosophy to Georges Bataille are configured as a critique of the legitimizing theories of violence to which she has referred with the concept of "transgressive eroticism".

Her work has bridged the gap between different currents in feminist theory. In her essay "For a Better World: Alicia Puleo's Critical Ecofeminism", UCLA professor Roberta Johnson writes, "In moving beyond the polarizing division between equality and difference feminism that has characterized Spanish feminist theory in the 1980s and 1990s, Puleo has found ways to combine equality feminism's reason and difference feminism's affect."

Ecofeminism
Puleo is recognized as one of the most relevant ecofeminist thinkers today. Roberta Johnson characterizes her as "arguably Spain's most prominent explicator-philosopher of the worldwide movement or theoretical orientation known as ecofeminism."

Puleo's proposal of what she has called a critical or enlightened ecofeminism can be considered a new nonessentialist form of environmental ethics in terms of gender. She does not consider that women are in a kind of symbiosis with nature, but is of the conviction that we live in an era of unsustainable growth that makes the link between feminism and ecology inevitable. She maintains that the mutual enrichment of both perspectives would allow building a culture of equality and sustainability.

Publications

Individual
 Cómo leer a Schopenhauer (1991) Editorial Júcar, Gijón-Madrid, 
 Dialéctica de la sexualidad. Género y sexo en la Filosofía Contemporánea (1992) Cátedra, Madrid, 
 La Ilustración olvidada. La polémica de los sexos en el siglo XVIII (1993), A. H. Puleo, editor. Prologue by Celia Amorós, with texts by Condorcet, Olympe de Gouges, Montesquieu, D'Alembert, and Louise d'Épinay. Anthropos, Barcelona. 
 Figuras del Otro en la Ilustración francesa. Diderot y otros autores (1996)  Escuela Libre Editorial, Madrid, 
 Filosofía, Género y Pensamiento crítico (2000) University of Valladolid, 
 Ecofeminismo para otro mundo posible (2011) Editorial Cátedra. Feminism Collection. Madrid,

Collective
 La filosofía contemporánea desde una perspectiva no androcéntrica (1992) A. H. Puleo, coord., Ministry of Education and Science, Madrid, 
 Papeles sociales de mujeres y hombres (1995) Alicia H. Puleo and Elisa Favaro, coord., Ministry of Education and Science, Madrid, 1995, 
 "Philosophie und Geschlecht in Spanien", in Die Philosophin (December 2002) No. 26, pp. 103–112, 
 Mujeres y Ecología. Historia, Pensamiento, Sociedad (2004) Cavana, María Luisa; Puleo, Alicia; Segura, Cristina, eds., Almudayna, Madrid, 
 '"Gender, Nature and Death" (2005) in De Sotelo, Elisabeth (ed.), New Women in Spain. Social-Political and Philosophical Studies of Feminist Thought, Lit Verlag, Münster/Transaction Publishers, New York, 2005, pp. 173–182, 
 "Del ecofeminismo clásico al deconstructivo: principales corrientes de un pensamiento poco conocido" (2005) in Amorós, Celia, De Miguel, Ana (eds.), Historia de la teoría feminista. De la Ilustración a la globalización, Minerva, Madrid, 2005, pp. 121–152, 
 "Un parcours philosophique: du désenchantement du monde à la compassion" in L'Esprit créateur (2006) Johns Hopkins University Press, Baltimore, Vol. 46, No. 2, pp. 5–16, 
 "Philosophy, Politics and Sexuality", in Femenías, María Luisa; Oliver, Amy; Feminist Philosophy in Latin America and Spain (2007) VIPS RODOPI, Amsterdam/New York, 
 "El hilo de Aradna: ecofeminismo, animales y crítica al androcentrismo" in Feminismo Ecológico. Estudios multidisciplinares de género (2007), University of Salamanca
 El reto de la igualdad de género. Nuevas perspectivas en Ética y Filosofía Política (2008) Alicia H. Puleo, Biblioteca Nueva, Madrid, 
 "Libertad, igualdad, sostenibilidad, por un ecofeminismo ilustrado" (2008) in Isegoría. Revista de Filosofía Moral y Política No. 38, Spanish National Research Council, Madrid, January–June 2008, pp. 39–59, 
 Ecología y Género en diálogo interdisciplinar (2015), Plaza y Valdés, 
 "Lo personal es político: el surgimiento del feminismo radical" (2005) in Ana de Miguel Álvarez and Celia Amorós, Teoría feminista: de la ilustración a la globalización II, Minerva. p. 58,

References

External links

 

1952 births
20th-century Spanish women writers
21st-century Spanish women writers
Anti-pornography feminists
Argentine expatriates in Spain
Argentine feminists
Complutense University of Madrid alumni
Ecofeminists
Feminist philosophers
Living people
Spanish feminists
Spanish philosophers
Spanish women philosophers
Academic staff of the University of Valladolid
Writers from Buenos Aires
Environmental ethicists